Varginha is a municipality in southwest Minas Gerais state, Brazil. Varginha stands out as one of the major centers of commerce and coffee production in Brazil and the world. The city is a center for export of coffee draining most of the production of the south of Minas Gerais, making the grain trade with several countries. The city is equidistant from the three largest metropolitan areas in Brazil (Belo Horizonte, Rio de Janeiro and São Paulo). The city is close to Rodovia Fernão Dias. The city is served by Maj. Brig. Trompowsky Airport .

Varginha achieved moderate fame in UFO circles due to the so-called Varginha UFO incident in 1996, in which two extraterrestrial beings were allegedly spotted by locals and later captured by the Brazilian Army, along with the local police and fire department. After this episode, the city began to invest in "UFO tourism". Today there are bus stops with the shape of spaceships and a water tower downtown also in the shape of a spaceship. In August 2004, UFO researchers from all over Brazil came together at the I UFO Congress of Varginha, organized with the support of the City Hall.

Geography 
According to the modern (2017) geographic classification by Brazil's National Institute of Geography and Statistics (IBGE), the city is the main municipality in the Intermediate Geographic Region of Varginha.

Distances to cities 
 São Paulo – 
 São Paulo–Guarulhos International Airport – 
 Rio de Janeiro – 
 Belo Horizonte – 
 Campinas – 
 Viracopos International Airport – 
 Santos – 
 Juiz de Fora – 
 Pouso Alegre – 
 Ribeirão Preto –

Economy

Varginha is a major regional hub for services and industries. Several factories are established in the city such as Philips-Walita, Inovacon, Plascar, CooperStandart, SteamMaster and Samsung. There are also a large number of small enterprises in the industrial sector with regional success. It is also one of the biggest producers of coffee in the world.

The city's main economy sectors are agriculture (especially coffee), engineering, steel, car parts and metal-mechanics.

Varginha has the biggest GDP in the southern region of Minas Gerais, a prosperous area with a high HDI and close to big economy centers in the state of São Paulo. The city was ranked 7th by Veja Magazine for the Top 20 mid-size cities to invest and live in Brazil.
 
Opened in 2012, the CIT-Centro Industrial Tecnológico (portuguese for Industrial and technological center) is a new industrial complex in the city's airport area and its home for the Porto Seco Sul de Minas (South Minas Dry Port), an imports/exports company for the city's coffee industry.

Its location is considered one of the best for the logistics and transportation industries, close to Brazil's biggest economy centers.

Sights

See also
Varginha UFO incident

References

External links
 Mais Varginha
 City government site
 Spaceship lights up city and attracts tourists
 The city chooses a new image for the ET
Varginha in the Media

Municipalities in Minas Gerais